AHRA may refer to:

 AHRA (robot), a network-based humanoid developed by the Korea Institute of Science and Technology
 Assisted Human Reproduction Act
 Audio Home Recording Act, a 1993 amendment to United States copyright law

See also
 Ahras, Syria